Dacia Literară was the first Romanian literary and political journal.

History 

Founded by Mihail Kogălniceanu and printed in Iaşi, Dacia Literară was a Romantic nationalist and liberal magazine, engendering a literary society. The first edition was short-lived—lasting only from January to June 1840.

References

External links 
 Revista „Dacia literară“, contemporary edition

1840 establishments in Europe
1840 establishments in the Ottoman Empire
19th-century establishments in Moldavia
Magazines established in 1840
Mass media in Iași
Monthly magazines published in Romania
Literary magazines published in Romania
Political magazines published in Romania
Romanian-language magazines